Ernestas Šetkus (born 25 May 1985) is a retired Lithuanian professional footballer who last played as a goalkeeper for Hapoel Tel Aviv from Israeli Premier League. He played for the Lithuania national team.

Career

Early career
Šetkus started his senior career with Žalgiris first team in 2005, before moved to Tauras in 2009. For the 2010 season he returned to Žalgiris and earned 16 appearances in the A Lyga. Šetkus played the first match of his second spell at Žalgiris on 21 March 2010, a 1–1 draw against Tauras and kept seven clean sheets.

Cyprus, Bulgaria and Belarus
In August 2010, Šetkus joined Cyprus side Olympiakos Nicosia. He made his debut on 2 October 2010 against Paphos. During 2010–11 season he kept two clean sheets in 18 league games. He began the following season as backup to his Latvian rival Andrejs Pavlovs. Šetkus played his first match of the campaign on 21 November 2011, keeping a clean sheet in the 0–0 draw against Aris Limassol. Later in the season Šetkus returned to be the senior goalkeeper of the team. On 7 January Šetkus got MVP of the Game award in a game against AEK Larnaca which finished 1–1. In April 2012 he was linked with Hibernian and Hearts.

During the summer of 2012, Šetkus signed a contract with newly promoted Parva liga club Botev Plovdiv. Šetkus made his official debut in the 3–0 home win over Slavia Sofia on 11 August 2012. On 31 January Šetkus was released from the club by Stanimir Stoilov. In March 2013 he was very close to sign a contract with Scottish side Kilmarnock.

On 28 March he signed short-term contract with Vysheyshaya Liga team Gomel. Few days later he got hamstring injury. After an injury on 23 June he made his first game in Vysheyshaya Liga in the 1–0 loss to Shakhtyor Soligorsk. A week later he helped his team to win 2–0 against Dynamo Brest keeping a clean sheet.

Greece, Turkey and the Netherlands
In July 2013, Šetkus came back to Cyprus signing a one-year contract with Nea Salamina. After the successful season in Cyprus, in July 2014, Šetkus signed one-year contract with Kerkyra playing in Superleague Greece.

On the 2015–16 season Šetkus signed for Sivasspor from the Süper Lig for one year. At the end of the season he went down with his team to the TFF First League.

On the 2016–17 season, Šetkus signed ADO Den Haag from the Eredivisie for one year. At the end of the season, he finished with his team in 11th place in the Eredivisie.

Israel
On 12 July 2017, Šetkus signed Hapoel Haifa from Israeli Premier League for two seasons. On 2 August, Šetkus made his debut in a 0–1 loss to Hapoel Acre at Sammy Ofer Stadium in the Toto Cup. On 19 August, Šetkus made his debut in 3–1 victory over Hapoel Ashkelon at Sammy Ofer Stadium in the Israeli Premier League. On 9 May 2018, Šetkus helped his team win the Israel State Cup after 44 years after a 3–1 win over the Beitar Jerusalem at Teddy Stadium. At the end of the season Šetkus won the title of "goalkeeper of the season".

On 4 July 2018, Šetkus concluded his terms at Hapoel Be'er Sheva, but on 5 July, the deal was blown after Hapoel Haifa club owners changed the agreement between the teams on their own. January's transfer window signed Šetkus in the Beitar Jerusalem for two seasons, concluding with him joining next season. By the end of this season, Šetkus had made 30 appearances in the Israeli Premier League and was a part of the Hapoel Haifa campaign in the qualifying European League.

On 20 June 2019, Šetkus signed Hapoel Be'er Sheva for two seasons after receiving permission from Beitar Jerusalem to leave for no consideration. On 11 July, Šetkus made his debut in Hapoel Be'er Sheva uniforms in a 1–1 draw against Laçi as part of the UEFA Europa League at Laçi Stadium. On 25 August, Šetkus made his debut in the Israeli Premier League in a 0–0 draw against the Beitar Jerusalem at Teddy Stadium.

International career
Šetkus was called up by Raimondas Žutautas to the full Lithuania national team squad for the friendly match against Poland. He made his debut on 25 March 2011 at the Darius and Girėnas Stadium, Kaunas. He came on at half time for Žydrūnas Karčemarskas with Lithuania 2–0 up.

On 3 June 2011, Šetkus made his first Lithuania start in their 2–0 loss in Vaduz against Liechtenstein in a Euro 2012 qualifying game.

On 7 June 2011, Šetkus played in a friendly game against Norway in Oslo. In 83rd minute he saved a penalty but Morten Gamst Pedersen scored on the rebound. The game finished 1–0 for Norway.

On 29 May 2012, Šetkus kept a clean sheet in a friendly game against Russia in Nyon, Switzerland.

Following the appointment of coach Edgaras Jankauskas to the Lithuania in June 2016, Šetkus became the team senior goalkeeper.

Honours
Hapoel Haifa
 Israel State Cup: 2017–18
 Israel Super Cup: 2018

Hapoel Be'er Sheva
 Israel State Cup: 2019–20

Individual
Goalkeeper of the season in Israel: 2017–18
Lithuanian Footballer of the Year: 2019

References

External links
Ernestas Šetkus at Israel Football Association
 
 

1985 births
Living people
People from Tauragė
Lithuanian footballers
Association football goalkeepers
Lithuania international footballers
FK Žalgiris players
FK Tauras Tauragė players
Olympiakos Nicosia players
Botev Plovdiv players
FC Gomel players
Nea Salamis Famagusta FC players
PAE Kerkyra players
Sivasspor footballers
ADO Den Haag players
Hapoel Haifa F.C. players
Hapoel Be'er Sheva F.C. players
Hapoel Tel Aviv F.C. players
Cypriot First Division players
First Professional Football League (Bulgaria) players
Super League Greece players
Süper Lig players
Eredivisie players
Israeli Premier League players
Lithuanian expatriate footballers
Expatriate footballers in Cyprus
Expatriate footballers in Bulgaria
Expatriate footballers in Belarus
Expatriate footballers in Greece
Expatriate footballers in Turkey
Expatriate footballers in the Netherlands
Expatriate footballers in Israel
Lithuanian expatriate sportspeople in Cyprus
Lithuanian expatriate sportspeople in Bulgaria
Lithuanian expatriate sportspeople in Belarus
Lithuanian expatriate sportspeople in Greece
Lithuanian expatriate sportspeople in Turkey
Lithuanian expatriate sportspeople in the Netherlands
Lithuanian expatriate sportspeople in Israel